Samuel Parot (born 5 December 1964) is a Chilean equestrian. He competed in two events at the 2012 Summer Olympics. In June 2021, he qualified to represent Chile at the 2020 Summer Olympics.

References

External links
 

1964 births
Living people
Chilean male equestrians
Olympic equestrians of Chile
Equestrians at the 2012 Summer Olympics
Equestrians at the 2007 Pan American Games
Equestrians at the 2011 Pan American Games
Equestrians at the 2015 Pan American Games
People from Talca
Pan American Games competitors for Chile
Equestrians at the 2020 Summer Olympics
20th-century Chilean people
21st-century Chilean people
South American Games bronze medalists for Chile
South American Games medalists in equestrian
Competitors at the 2022 South American Games